Malmi may refer to:

People
 Anne Malmi (born 1965), Finnish curler
 Jalmari Malmi (1893–1943), Finnish farmer and politician
 Teemu Malmi (born 1965), Finnish organizational theorist

Places
Malmi, Helsinki, a district in the city of Helsinki, Finland
 Malmi railway station
Malmi, Pyhtää, a village in the municipality of Pyhtää, Finland

Other uses
 Taranis malmi, a sea snail of family Raphitomidae